Hazy refers to a state of haze.

Hazy may also refer to:

People
 Hazy Osterwald (1922–2012), Swiss bandleader, trumpeter, and vibraphonist
 Steve Hazy (born 1946), American billionaire businessman

Music
 "Hazy", a song by Chloe x Halle from the 2021 album Ungodly Hour
 "Hazy", a 2006 song by Gemma Hayes and Adam Duritz
 "Hazy", a 2021 song by Great Gable
 "Hazy", a 2022 song by Kyle Dion featuring Tkay Maidza

Other uses 
 Hazy IPA, a style of beer
 Hazy Creek, stream in the U.S. state of West Virginia

See also
 Haze (disambiguation)